The Peak Performance King of Style is a big air contest for freestyle skiers with a global reputation for its big jump and world class starting field.
The event attracts an audience from all over the world, both live TV crowds and up to 25,000 spectators at the stadium. In 2009 the contest gathered 24 of the best skiers at Stockholm Olympic Stadium to crown the Peak performance King of Style.

King of Style is part of the Stadium Winter Jam which also includes a big air contest for snowboarders, the LG Snowboard FIS World Cup, as well as a winter sport exhibition, a rail arena open for the public and lots more.

In the video qualification round, any skier can compete and the prize is travel and accommodation for the riders placed top 4. The winner gets a position in the head to head final and the other 3 are part of the qualifying round. The video qualification is open for everyone and the set-up is simple. Competitors upload a maximum 60 seconds long video starring themselves on YouTube.

Visitors can mark “like” under their favorite edits, and a jury picks 4 winners out of the 20 highest rated videos. The Peak Performance King of Style video qualification starts at September 23 and ends October 24. Winners will be announced October 28.

Previous winners
2009: Andreas Håtveit
2008: PK Hunder
2007: Sammy Carlson

External links
Peakperformance/kos
Facebook.com/kingofstyle
King Of Style blog
Stadium Winter Jam

Skiing competitions in Sweden
Freestyle skiing competitions